Elizabeth Selden White Rogers (July 23, 1868 – December 18, 1950) was a civic reformer working to improve the New York public schools, and to win suffrage for women in the state of New York and the nation.

Early life and education
She was born on July 23, 1868, in Astoria, Queens, New York. Her sister was Mabel Wellington White, wife of US Secretary of War Henry L. Stimson, she was also the maternal granddaughter of Union Major General Amos Beebe Eaton and a descendant of Roger Sherman, one of the Founding Fathers of the United States.

Elizabeth Selden Rogers married John Rogers (1865-1939) in 1895. He was later at the Cornell Medical School. They had a daughter, Elizabeth Selden Rogers, who married Francis H. Horan, and two sons.

Her grandfather General Eaton was the son of Amos Eaton and Sally Cady Eaton, and was the first cousin of Elizabeth Cady Stanton. She was also the great-niece of Henry R. Selden, who defended Susan B. Anthony when she was arrested for voting in the 1872 national election. Henry was the brother of her grandmother and namesake Elizabeth Selden Eaton.

Career
She was chairman of the Advisory Council of the National Woman's Party and its Legislative Chairman for New York, and was one of the most forceful speakers in the "Prison Special" bus tour across the country; during which suffragists spoke of their experience in jail. Rogers was arrested, as part of the Silent Sentinels protest, on July 14, 1917 for picketing in front of the United States White House, and was sentenced to sixty days in Occoquan Workhouse in Virginia; but she was quickly pardoned by US President Woodrow Wilson after just three days.

The following is an excerpt from Elizabeth Selden Rogers's editorial, "Why We Withdrew," published in Women's Political World in 1915:
A great deal is said of the value of co-operation of all societies and the economy of not duplicating work. While believing heartily in a certain amount and kind of co-operation, we are not blind to the fact that too complete unity may result. in stagnation ... The [Women's Political) Union believes that the existence of many suffrage societies is an evidence of the vitality of the movement, and that the friendly rivalry of such societies results in more and better work being done, that it gives the freedom necessary to growth, affording scope for individuality, and allowing personality to count. ... To those of our members who are worrying over this co-operate (sic) idea, we would point out that if in the past four or five years the Women's Political Union in New York City had been bound by a two-thirds vote of a campaign committee, like the one now formed, we would never have had a parade, or an outdoor meeting, or a campaign against certain enemies in the Legislature.

Personal life
Elizabeth Selden White Rogers died on December 18, 1950 in New York City.

See also
Women's suffrage
Women's rights

References

External links

Nationality Rights in International Perspective
Biographical Sketch of Elizabeth Selden White Rogers, Online Biographical Dictionary of Militant Woman Suffragists, 1913-1920
Remembering Elizabeth Selden Rogers, One of Putnam County’s Leading Suffragists Who Arrested at the White House
National Woman's Party Fine Art Collection - 1993.002
The Portrait Gallery, Belmont Paul Women's Equality National Monument
Mrs. John Rogers Jr. -- at suffrage shop - Library of Congress
Elizabeth Selden Rogers. Copied Letters of Elizabeth and Roxana Selden, 1817-1878
ELIZABETH SELDEN ROGERS (1868-1950), American reformer and suffragist
October 6, 1911: As California Suffrage Vote Nears, Activists Remain Positive

1868 births
American women's rights activists
American feminists
American suffragists
People from New Haven, Connecticut
1950 deaths
National Woman's Party activists